Cold Stream is an unincorporated community in Hampshire County in the U.S. state of West Virginia. Cold Stream is located north of Capon Bridge on Cold Stream Road (West Virginia Secondary Route 15). Referred to as Edwards Run in its past, the community of Cold Stream is in proximity to where Edwards Run empties into the Cacapon River. The community most likely took its name from a nearby stream of the same name noted for the cold water it contains. Their post office has been closed.

References

External links

Unincorporated communities in Hampshire County, West Virginia
Unincorporated communities in West Virginia